Erik Thorell (born March 3, 1992) is a Swedish professional ice hockey player who currently plays for HC Sparta Praha in the Czech Extraliga (ELH)). He has previously played with HIFK in the Finnish elite league.

Playing career
On April 24, 2019, Thorell joined EV Zug of the National League on a two-year deal worth CHF 1.2 million.

References

External links

1992 births
Living people
BIK Karlskoga players
Färjestad BK players
HIFK (ice hockey) players
Karlskrona HK players
Sportspeople from Karlstad
Rögle BK players
HC Sparta Praha players
Swedish ice hockey left wingers
HC TPS players
EV Zug players